Jimmy Connors was the defending champion but did not compete that year.

Brian Gottfried won in the final 2–6, 6–1, 6–3 against Guillermo Vilas.

Draw

Finals

Top half

Section 1

Section 2

Bottom half

Section 3

Section 4

References
 1977 American Airlines Tennis Games Draw - Men's Singles

American Airlines Tennis Games - Singles